A3G may refer to:

 APOBEC3G, an immune system enzyme 
 Apartment 3-G, a comic strip
 A nickname for David Lat